Saint Nicolas may refer to:

Places

In Belgium
Saint-Nicolas, Liège, in the Province of Liège
Sint-Niklaas, in the Province of East Flanders

In Canada
 Saint-Nicolas, Quebec

In France
Saint-Nicolas, Pas-de-Calais
Saint-Nicolas-aux-Bois, in the Aisne département 
Saint-Nicolas-d'Aliermont, in the Seine-Maritime département
Saint-Nicolas-d'Attez, in the Eure département 
Saint-Nicolas-de-Bliquetuit, in the Seine-Maritime département
Saint-Nicolas-de-Bourgueil, in the Indre-et-Loire département 
Saint-Nicolas-de-la-Balerme, in the Lot-et-Garonne département 
Saint-Nicolas-de-la-Grave, in the Tarn département 
Saint-Nicolas-de-la-Haie, in the Seine-Maritime département
Saint-Nicolas-de-la-Taille, in the Seine-Maritime département 
Saint-Nicolas-de-Macherin, in the Isère département
Saint-Nicolas-de-Pierrepont, in the Manche département
Saint-Nicolas-de-Port, in the Meurthe-et-Moselle département 
Saint-Nicolas-de-Redon, in the Loire-Atlantique département 
Saint-Nicolas-des-Biefs, in the Allier département 
Saint-Nicolas-des-Bois, Manche, in the Manche département
Saint-Nicolas-des-Bois, Orne, in the Orne département 
Saint-Nicolas-des-Laitiers, in the Orne département
Saint-Nicolas-des-Motets, in the Indre-et-Loire département 
Saint-Nicolas-de-Sommaire, in the Orne département
Saint-Nicolas-du-Bosc, in the Eure département 
Saint-Nicolas-du-Pélem, in the Côtes-d'Armor département 
Saint-Nicolas-du-Tertre, in the Morbihan département 
Saint-Nicolas-la-Chapelle, Aube, in the Aube département
Saint-Nicolas-la-Chapelle, Savoie, in the Savoie département 
Saint-Nicolas-lès-Cîteaux, in the Côte-d'Or département

Former communes

Saint-Nicolas-Courbefy, a former commune of the Aisne département, now a part of Bussière-Galant
Saint-Nicolas-de-Brem, a former commune of the Vendée département, now a part of Brem-sur-Mer 
Saint-Nicolas-de-Coutances, a former commune of the Manche département, now a part of Coutances
Saint-Nicolas-de-Véroce, a former commune of the Haute-Savoie département, now a part of Saint-Gervais-les-Bains
Saint-Nicolas-du-Bosc-l'Abbé, a former commune of the Eure département, now part of Caorches-Saint-Nicolas
Saint-Nicolas-en-Forêt, a former commune of the Moselle département, now part of Hayanve 
Saint-Nicolas-près-Granville, a former commune in the Manche département, now part of Granville

In Italy

Saint-Nicolas, Aosta Valley

Music
Saint Nicolas (Britten), a cantata by Benjamin Britten

See also
 Saint Nicholas (disambiguation)